Muhyuddin Andavar Mosque (Tamil: முஹ்யுத்தீன் ஆண்டவர் பள்ளிவாசல் - Muḥyuddīn Āndavar Pallivāsal, Arabic: مسجد سيد محي الدين - Masjid Sayyid Muhyu-d Din, English: Saint Muhyuddin Mosque) is the only congregational mosque in the town of Thiruppanandal in the Thanjavur district of Tamil Nadu, India. It is administered according to the Sunni-Hanafi school of jurisprudence. It is part of a complex that houses a mausoleum, a cemetery, and a number of shops that are rented out to generate income for the running of the mosque.

History

In the early 80's, the old Mosque was torn down and re-built in the current form. The inauguration of the new mosque was held on Friday, 3 February 1989.

Mosque Architecture

The mosque follows the architecture of South Indian mosques that were built or re-built in the 20th century with some notable exceptions. Externally, the mosque is fronted by two minarets. Curiously there is no dome. To the right is the traditional pool used for Wudu and a side entrance to the graveyard.

Internally, the mosque is two storeys high. The ground floor houses the inner prayer hall where the Congregational prayers are performed. It is surrounded by a cloister and an outer prayer hall where town meetings, religious discourses, wedding ceremonies, and dhikr gatherings are held.

Another unique aspect of the mosque is the absence of a physical Minbar or pulpit. Instead, there is a hidden passageway from the Mihrab or prayer niche that leads to a balcony that extends out. The Khatib or prayer leader delivers the Khutba or sermon from here.

The Mausoleum

At the entrance of the mosque complex is the mausoleum of a celebrated Faqir, Sheikh Abdur Rahman Baksh (Arabic: عبد الرحمن بكش - Abdu-r Raḥmān Baksh, Tamil: மஸ்தான் சாஹிப் வலியுல்லா - Mastān Ṣāḥib Waliyullah). His Urs or anniversary is celebrated with pomp and fanfare on the Islamic calendar date of 22 Rabi al-Awwal.

His resting abode is taken as a source of immense blessings (Arabic: بركة - Barakah, Tamil: பரகத் - Barakat) and where mercy (Arabic: رحمة - Rahmah, Tamil: ரஹ்மத் - Rahmat) descends in abundance. Both Muslims and non-Muslims make vows (Arabic: نذر - nadhr, Tamil: நேர்ச்சை - Nerchchai) at his grave for conceiving children, success in business, education, and other worldly needs.

The following anecdote, handed down from previous generations, is an example recounting his Karamat or miraculous exploits:

During the re-development of the mosque in the 80's, plans were drawn to build a structure over the grave that linked to the adjacent Madrasa buildings. It came to a halt when a pious elder of the town had a dream in which Abdur Rahman Baksh admonished the villagers against building over his grave.

Annual Mawlid Competition

Between 1998 and 2001, the mosque hosted an annual Mawlid Recital Competition (Tamil: மெளலிது ஷரீஃப் ஓதும் போட்டி - Mawlid Shareef Othum Potti). It was held in the last weekend of the month of May to coincide with the school holidays.

The competition drew young participants from neighbouring towns and villages who would recite the text known as "Subhana Mawlid" - a reverential text on the birth, life, and miracles of Prophet Muhammad. Prominent Tamil scholars were invited to deliver lectures.

Gallery

External links

 Sacred Sacrifice - a socio-religious initiative to feed the poor

Mosques in Tamil Nadu
Sufi shrines
Sunni mosques in India
Tamil history
Mosques completed in 1989
Buildings and structures in Thanjavur district